A weekend is the part of the week that is traditionally devoted to rest, rather than work.

Weekend or Week End may also refer to:

Arts and entertainment

Music

Artists
The Weeknd (born 1990), Canadian singer and songwriter
The Weekend (Canadian band) (formed 1998), pop rock
Weekend (Welsh band) (1981–1983), new wave
Weekend (American band) (formed 2009), shoegaze
Weekend (Polish band) (formed 2000), disco polo/dance

Albums
Weekend (Underground Lovers album)
Weekend (Kenny Lattimore album)
Weekend (The Sounds album)
Weekend (EP), by Young Lyre
The Weekend (album), by Smashproof
The Weekend, an album by Hey Mercedes

Songs
"Weekends" (The Black Eyed Peas song)
"The Weekend" (Brantley Gilbert song)
"Weekend" (Daz song)
"Weekend" (Earth and Fire song)
"Weekend" (Eddie Cochran song)
"Weekend" (The Todd Terry Project song)
"Week End" (Lorie song)
"Weekend" (Mac Miller song)
"The Weekend" (Michael Gray song)
"The Weekend" (Steve Wariner song)
"The Weekend" (SZA song)
"Weekend" (Taeyeon song)
"Weekend" (Wet Willie song)
"Week End" (X Japan song)
"Weekend", by 8stops7 from their album Birth of a Cynic
"Weekend", by Bloodhound Gang from their album Jumping All Over the World
"Weekend", by Class Action
"Weekend", by Flume from his EP Skin Companion EP 2
"Weekend", by Ladytron from her album Witching Hour
"Weekend", 2012 song by Last Dinosaurs from In a Million Years
"The Weekend", by Modern Baseball from their album Sports
"Weekend", by Priory
"Weekend", by Robin Gibb from his album Robin's Reign
"Weekends", by Skrillex
"Weekend", by Smith Westerns from their album Dye It Blonde
"Weekend", by The Sounds from their album Weekend
"The Weekend", by The Wanted from their album Battleground

Festivals
Weekend Festival (from 2012), a summer festival in Finland

Films
Week-end (1935 film), a Danish film by Lau Lauritzen and Alice O'Fredericks
Weekend (1967 film), a French film by Jean-Luc Godard
Weekends (2004), an American TV film starring Amanda Detmer
Weekend (2010 film), a Polish film by Cezary Pazura
Weekend (2011 film), a British film by Andrew Haigh
Le Week-End, a 2013 British film
The Weekend (2016 film), a British comedy
The Weekend (2018 film), an American comedy
Weekends in Normandy, originally titled Week-ends, a French film by Anne Villacèque
Weekends (2018 film), an American animated short

Plays
Weekend (play), a 1968 political comedy by Gore Vidal

Television
Weekend (talk show), a 2014–2017 British breakfast entertainment/magazine show
Weekend (1974 TV program), a 1974–1979 American television news magazine that aired on NBC
"Weekend", an episode of the British sitcom Men Behaving Badly
"The Weekend" (Homeland), a TV episode
"The Weekend" (Bluey), an episode of the first season of the animated TV series Bluey

Novels
 The Weekend, the American release name of Dirty Weekend, a 1991 British novel by Helen Zahavi
Weekend (novel), 2006, by William McIlvanney

Publications
Weekend (Ceylonese newspaper)
Weekend (magazine) (1951–1979), a Canadian newspaper supplement

See also
 
Weekender (disambiguation)
Week Ending, a BBC satirical radio series which ran from 1970 to 1998
WKND (disambiguation), whose uses include radio station call signs or branding
 
 
 Week (disambiguation)
 End (disambiguation)
 Workweek